Henry Dutton (1844 – 25 August 1914) was a pastoralist in South Australia, known as the "Squire of Anlaby". He was the father of Henry Hampden Dutton and a grandfather of writer Geoffrey Dutton.

History
Henry was born in Melbourne, Victoria, a son of (William) Hampden Dutton (1805 – 21 November 1849) and his wife Charlotte da Silva Dutton, née Cameron (1813 – 11 May 1885), a stepdaughter of Capt. John Finnis (1802–1872). Their families were notable in South Australian history; his uncle Francis Stacker Dutton was involved in the discovery and exploitation of the copper deposits near Kapunda and was later Premier of the colony.

His parents moved to South Australia in December 1838 and settled for a while in Mount Barker. Hampden persuaded his younger brother Frederick, who was then in Melbourne, to move to South Australia.

When Henry was five years old his father died; his mother either returned to, or remained in South Australia, living at Strangways Terrace, North Adelaide. Henry was educated at St Peter's College, and in 1869 was working as a clerk then teller for the Bank of South Australia, moving to Yankalilla around 1870, Brighton 1872, then around 1880 Mount Pleasant, where he was bank manager in 1890 when his uncle Frederick died, leaving him "Anlaby".

Henry put a great deal of effort into the development of the "Anlaby" residence. What had started in 1841 as a shingle-covered hut built by overseer Alexander Buchanan (c. 1809 – 21 May 1865) and his wife Penelope Ann, née Haddrick  he developed into what has been described as a "mansion, set in delightful surroundings".  The property decreased in size and importance over the years: part was subdivided for "closer settlement", then another tranche was acquired by the State government for "soldier settlement", but Henry also acquired additional property: North Booborowie, near Burra, in partnership with John Melrose, and Koonowla vineyard and orchard, on the road between Saddleworth and Auburn. He purchase Koonowla in 1906 for £10,000, and owned the estate until his death. 

When James Martin & Company was liquidated in 1907, he purchased the business, and by enforcing some rationalization, kept the business viable within his lifetime, to the benefit of the town.

He died after a few days' illness, diagnosed as having a blood clot on the brain. He was buried at Anlaby.

Yacht Adele

Dutton was a member of the Royal South Australian Yacht Squadron. His steam yacht Adele, built for him by Hawthorn and Co., Ltd., was one of the finest pleasure yachts in Australia. The yacht's dimensions were:
L.B.P. 
L.W.L 
Breadth moulded 
Depth moulded 
Tonnage 
The bulwarks were of steel, neatly paneled with teak and so arranged that they could be taken down when the yacht was laid up. Adele was fitted with steam and hand steering gear, teak and brass-mounted. The masts and bowsprit were of Oregon pine and the yacht was rigged as a schooner. There were eight cabins neatly paneled with polished hard woods, each containing lockers and drawers, dressing tables and wardrobes, and the wash basins had a hot and cold water supply. The guaranteed speed was 11.5 knots on a measured mile, and 11 knots for six hours.
She carried four boats:
a 23 ft gig
an 18 ft cutter
a 14 ft dinghy
a 22 ft motor launch fitted with a Gardner engine and Gaines reversible propeller
Henry Way Rymill, for many years Commodore of the R.S.A.Y.S., was a godson of Henry Dutton, and recalled cruising with Dutton on Adele for three months every year. Adele was also on the register of the Royal Yacht Squadron at Cowes, and as Dutton was a member of it, he had the right to fly the White Ensign.

Other interests
Henry Dutton was a devoted Anglican, and while a bank employee supported the local Church: while living in Brighton he was a warden at St Jude's Church, Brighton and often served as organist. In 1896 he built a small church in Hamilton, near Anlaby, dedicated to the memory of his uncle, his wife, and daughter. The church, though of austere Norman architecture externally, was elaborately fitted out inside, and furnished with a pipe organ built by Frederick Taylor. This instrument proved unreliable and its replacement, by J. E. Dodd, was installed in 1914, and first played by Dutton's daughter-in-law, Emily Dutton (née Martin).

Family
Henry Dutton (1844 at Melbourne – 25 or 26 August 1914 at Anlaby) married Helen Elizabeth Thomas (c. 1844 – 8 October 1901) on 10 May 1873. They had two children:
Ethel da Silva Dutton (3 February 1876 – 8 February 1892) died after fall from rocks, Granite Island.
Henry Hampden Dutton (13 February 1879 – 15 June 1932) inherited 'Anlaby' in 1914, and is remembered for his motoring exploits. He married Emily Martin (1884–1962), daughter of John Felix Martin (1844–1916) of Gawler on 29 November 1905; their children included:
John Hansborough Dutton (23 August 1906 – 1989)
Richard Hampden Dutton (6 August 1909 – 13 December 1940) married Margaret Elizabeth Jean Newland (10 January 1910 – 1988), daughter of Victor Marra Newland, on 25 February 1933, divorced July 1940. She married again, to Sidney Downer (September 1909 – September 1969) on 8 September 1948. They separated around 1960.
Bryony Helen Carola Dutton (22 October 1918 – 2005) was engaged to William Weatherly (Flying Officer with 459 Squadron and later awarded DFC) in 1940 but married American soldier William Robert Curkeet on 24 August 1942. She returned to South Australia in 1945; they divorced and she married distinguished lawyer Professor, later Sir, Richard Arthur "Dick" Blackburn OBE (26 July 1918 – 1 October 1987) on 1 December 1951. They had two children:
Charlotte Blackburn, later Calder
Tom Blackburn SC
Geoffrey Piers Henry Dutton (2 August 1922 – 17 September 1998), a noted writer

References 

Australian pastoralists
Australian sailors
1844 births
1914 deaths
19th-century Australian businesspeople